Johnston County is a county located in the U.S. state of Oklahoma. As of the 2010 census, the population was 10,957. Its county seat is Tishomingo. It was established at statehood on November 16, 1907, and named for Douglas H. Johnston, a governor of the Chickasaw Nation.

Johnston County is part of the Texoma Region.

History
In 1820, the U.S. government granted the land now known as Johnston County to the Choctaw tribe. Many of the Choctaws began moving to the new land in Indian Territory in 1830. The rest followed Chickasaw tribe, who were closely related to the Choctaw, formally separated from the Choctaw Nation in the late 1830s, relocating to the western part of the Choctaw Nation. The Chickasaw Nation named the town of Tishomingo as its capital and built a brick capitol building there in 1856.

Several educational institutions were established in the Chickasaw Nation before the Civil War. The Pleasant Grove Mission School and the Chickasaw Academy were founded by the Methodist Episcopal Church in 1844. The Presbyterians, in partnership with the Chickasaw Nation, opened the Wapanucka Female Manual Labour School in 1852.

The Chickasaw government joined the Confederate States of America after the outbreak of the Civil War. The Union army ordered its troops to evacuate Fort Washita, Fort Cobb and Fort Arbuckle. When Confederate troops occupied the area, they used the stone building at Wapanucka as a hospital and a prison.

Several railroads built tracks through this area about the turn of the 20th century.  In 1900–1901 the St. Louis, Oklahoma and Southern Railway, which the St. Louis and San Francisco Railroad (Frisco) purchased in June 1901, laid tracks north–south through the area. In 1902, the Western Oklahoma Railroad, which became the Choctaw, Oklahoma and Gulf Railroad (CO&G), built a line southwest to northeast through the present county. In 1908 – 1910 the Missouri, Oklahoma and Gulf Railway (MO&G), (acquired by the Kansas, Oklahoma and Gulf Railway in 1919,) laid a north–south line in the far eastern portion of Johnston County. In 1911, the MO&G built a spur west to Bromide, an early-twentieth-century health resort, capitalizing on the vicinity's natural springs. Now the Burlington Northern and Santa Fe, which acquired the Frisco in 1980, is the only railroad left in the county.

Geography

The northern part of the county lies in the Arbuckle Mountains, which consists of rock outcroppings and rolling hills. The southern part of the county is part of the Coastal Plains region, and is more suitable for farming. The county is drained by the Washita and Blue Rivers and Pennington Creek, which are all tributaries of  the Red River. An arm of Lake Texoma protrudes into southern Johnston County.

Major highways
  U.S. Highway 377
  State Highway 1
  State Highway 7
 State Highway 12
  State Highway 22
  State Highway 48
  State Highway 78

Adjacent counties
 Pontotoc County (north)
 Coal County (northeast)
 Atoka County (east)
 Bryan County (southeast)
 Marshall County (south)
 Carter County (west)
 Murray County (northwest)

National protected area
 Tishomingo National Wildlife Refuge (part)

Demographics

As of the census of 2000, there were 10,513 people, 4,057 households, and 2,900 families residing in the county.  The population density was 16 people per square mile (6/km2).  There were 4,782 housing units at an average density of 7 per square mile (3/km2).  The racial makeup of the county was 76.09% White, 1.66% Black or African American, 15.32% Native American, 0.27% Asian, 0.05% Pacific Islander, 1.24% from other races, and 5.38% from two or more races.  2.47% of the population were Hispanic or Latino of any race. 97.0% spoke English, 1.6% Spanish and 1.2% Choctaw as their first language.

There were 4,057 households, out of which 31.30% had children under the age of 18 living with them, 56.60% were married couples living together, 10.70% had a female householder with no husband present, and 28.50% were non-families. 25.20% of all households were made up of individuals, and 12.20% had someone living alone who was 65 years of age or older.  The average household size was 2.53 and the average family size was 3.02.

In the county, the population was spread out, with 25.50% under the age of 18, 9.70% from 18 to 24, 25.00% from 25 to 44, 24.30% from 45 to 64, and 15.40% who were 65 years of age or older.  The median age was 38 years. For every 100 females there were 96.80 males.  For every 100 females age 18 and over, there were 94.10 males.

The median income for a household in the county was $24,592, and the median income for a family was $30,292. Males had a median income of $25,240 versus $19,868 for females. The per capita income for the county was $13,747.  About 17.80% of families and 22.00% of the population were below the poverty line, including 28.00% of those under age 18 and 19.30% of those age 65 or over.

Politics

Education
Murray State School of Agriculture opened in Tishomingo in 1908. In 1972 the community college's name changed to Murray State College.

Communities

Cities
 Tishomingo (county seat)

Towns
 Bromide
 Mannsville
 Milburn
 Mill Creek
 Ravia
 Wapanucka

Census-designated places
 Bee
 Coleman
 Connerville

Other unincorporated communities

 Bromide Junction
 Earl
 Emet
 Fillmore
 Folsom
 Nida
 Pontotoc
 Reagan
 Russett
 Troy

Notable people
 Bill Anoatubby, governor of the Chickasaw Nation.
 Neill Armstrong, coach of the Chicago Bears.
 Gene Autry, American performer raised in Ravia.
 Te Ata Fisher, Chickasaw storyteller, born in Emet.
 William H. "Alfalfa Bill" Murray, former governor of Oklahoma.
 Johnston Murray, son of William H. Murray and also a governor of Oklahoma.

See also
 National Register of Historic Places listings in Johnston County, Oklahoma

References

External links
 Johnston County EMS
 Encyclopedia of Oklahoma History and Culture - Johnston County
 Oklahoma Digital Maps: Digital Collections of Oklahoma and Indian Territory

 
1907 establishments in Oklahoma
Populated places established in 1907